Phraek Sa station is a BTS Skytrain station, on the Sukhumvit Line in Samut Prakan Province, Thailand.

It opened on 6 December 2018 as part of the 13-km eastern extension. Rides on the extension were free until April 16, 2019.

References

See also
 Bangkok Skytrain

BTS Skytrain stations
Railway stations opened in 2018